Sir Hiralal Jekisundas Kania (3 November 1890 – 6 November 1951) was the first Chief Justice of India. He served as the Chief Justice of India from 1950 to 1951. He died while serving in office in 1951.

Early life and education
Kania was born in a middle-class family at Surat. His grandfather had been a revenue officer in Gujarat with the British Government, and his father Jekisundas Kania was a Sanskrit professor and later principal of Samaldas College in the princely state of Bhavnagar. His elder brother Hiralal Jekisundas Kania was also a barrister whose son Madhukar Hiralal Kania became a Supreme Court judge in 1987, and subsequently Chief Justice. Kania took his BA from Samaldas College in 1910, followed by an LLB from Government Law College, Bombay in 1912 and an LLM from the same institution in 1913.

Law career
Kania began to practise as a barrister at the Bombay High Court in 1915, subsequently marrying Kusum Mehta, the daughter of Sir Chunilal Mehta, sometime member of the executive council of the Governor of Bombay."

For a time, Kania served as acting editor of the Indian Law Reports. Briefly serving as an acting judge on the Bombay High Court in 1930, he was appointed an additional judge on the same court in June 1931, serving until March 1933. Kania then returned to the bar for three months until he was promoted to associate judge in June. Kania was knighted in the 1943 Birthday Honours list. By then the most senior associate judge at the High Court, he was intended to succeed Chief Justice Sir John Beaumont upon the latter's retirement; however, as Beaumont was biased against Indians, he passed Kania over in favour of the next in line, Sir John Stone. While Stone was personally against Kania being passed over, he accepted Beaumont's nomination. However, Kania served as acting chief justice from May–September 1944 and from June–October 1945. He was promoted to associate judge of the Federal Court of India, then headed by Sir Patrick Spens (later Lord Spens) on 20 June 1946. Spens retired on 14 August 1947, and Kania succeeded him as Chief Justice. After India became a republic on 26 January 1950, Kania was appointed the first Chief Justice of the Supreme Court of India. Acting as Chief Justice he read the oath to the first President of India Dr. Rajendra Prasad. He died while in office of a sudden heart attack on 6 November 1951, aged 61.

References

External links

 
 

1890 births
Chief justices of India
20th-century Indian judges
Indian Knights Bachelor
Knights Bachelor
Judges of the Bombay High Court
1951 deaths
People from Surat
20th-century Indian lawyers

ml:എച്ച്.ജെ. കനിയ